HMS Exmoor was a  destroyer of the Royal Navy. She was a member of the first subgroup of the class, and saw service in the Second World War, before being sunk by German E-boats in 1941.

Construction and commissioning
Exmoor was ordered under the 1939 Naval Building Programme from Parsons Marine Steam Turbines Company, with the hull building being subcontracted to the Vickers-Armstrongs yard, Tyneside. She was laid down as Job No J4099 on 8 June 1939 and launched on 25 January 1940. She was commissioned into service on 18 October 1940, and after working up, was assigned to the 16th Destroyer Flotilla at Scapa Flow.

Career
Exmoor returned on 11 November and resumed her working up period. In December she escorted the armed merchant cruisers Chitral and Salopian on their way to begin patrols. Exmoor then sailed to Plymouth.

In January Exmoor was part of the escort for the battleship  as she sailed from Portsmouth to Rosyth. Exmoor then sailed to Harwich to begin escorting coastal convoys through the North Sea with the 16th Destroyer Flotilla. The convoy was attacked by E-boats as it passed off Lowestoft on 25 February. Exmoor suffered an explosion aft, suffering major structural damage and rupturing a fuel supply line. A fire soon broke out which spread rapidly. Exmoor capsized and sank in ten minutes. The survivors were picked up by Shearwater and the trawler Commander Evans, and were taken to Great Yarmouth. Exmoor had either been hit by a torpedo fired by the E-Boat S30 commanded by Klaus Feldt, as the Germans claimed, or had struck a mine as the Admiralty claimed. The wreck is designated as a protected place under the Protection of Military Remains Act 1986. During a 2008-2011 marine biology survey of the area in which she was sunk, the RV Cefas Endeavour discovered the wreck.

References

Further reading

External links
HMS Exmoor's wartime career
Exmoor at Uboat.net

 

Hunt-class destroyers of the Royal Navy
Ships built on the River Tyne
1940 ships
World War II destroyers of the United Kingdom
World War II shipwrecks in the North Sea
Protected Wrecks of the United Kingdom
Maritime incidents in February 1941
Ships built by Vickers Armstrong